The men's 100 metre backstroke competition of the swimming events at the 2011 World Aquatics Championships was held on July 25 with the preliminary round and the semifinals and July 26 with the final.

Records
Prior to the competition, the existing world and championship records were as follows.

Results

Heats
50 swimmer participated in 7 heats.

Swimoff
As two swimmers had the same time in the heats at place 16 they had to participate in a swimoff to determine the last semifinal swimmer, it was held at 11:36.

Semifinals
The semifinals were held at 18:10.

Semifinal 1

Semifinal 2

Final
The final was held at 19:06.

References

External links
2011 World Aquatics Championships: Men's 100 metre backstroke start list, from OmegaTiming.com; retrieved 2011-07-23.

Backstroke 100 metre, men's
World Aquatics Championships